Jablaničko lake is a large artificially formed lake on the Neretva river, right below Konjic where the Neretva expands into a wide valley. The river provided lot of fertile, agricultural land there, before the lake flooded most of it. The lake was created in 1953 after construction of  Jablanica Dam near Jablanica in central Bosnia and Herzegovina.

The lake has an irregular elongated shape. Its width varies along its length. The lake is a popular vacation destination in Bosnia and Herzegovina. 
Swimming, boating, and especially fishing are popular activities on the lake. Many weekend cottages have been built along the shores of the lake.
There are 13 types of fish in the lake's ecosystem.

However, the lake  suffered from poor management of water and fisheries. Without any scientific and management plans or research, local fisheries and angling management introduced, alien, non-indigenous or non-native species, either deliberately or accidentally, which did more harm and damage than good. As the Neretva has many endemic and fragile species of fish that are near extinction, introductions of this invasive species, Pike Perch (Stizostedion lucioperca L.), completely destroyed native endemic and highly endangered fish like Strugač (Leuciscus svallize svallize Heck. et Kn.) or (Squalius svallize) and Glavatica (Salmo marmoratus) (also known as Gonjavac).

Gallery

See also

Water bodies

 Upper Neretva
 Rakitnica

Settlements

 Ulog
 Glavatičevo
 Lukomir
 Jablanica

Protected environment and treasures

 Blidinje
 List of birds of BiH
 List of national parks of BiH

Nature and culture

 Salmo obtusirostris
 Salmo dentex
 Salmo marmoratus
 Tourism in Bosnia and Herzegovina

References 

Lakes of Bosnia and Herzegovina
Jablanica, Bosnia and Herzegovina
RJablanica
Recreational fishing in Bosnia and Herzegovina